In mathematics, the Kummer variety of an abelian variety is its quotient by the map taking any element to its inverse.
The Kummer variety of a 2-dimensional abelian variety is called a Kummer surface.

References

Abelian varieties